Semenkovo is a rural locality (a village) in Arkhangelskoye Rural Settlement, Sokolsky District, Vologda Oblast, Russia. The population was 14 as of 2002.

Geography 
Semenkovo is located 20 km northwest of Sokol (the district's administrative centre) by road. Gladkino is the nearest rural locality.

References 

Rural localities in Sokolsky District, Vologda Oblast